Jacquy Pfeiffer (born 1961) is a French master pastry chef and teacher. He co-founded the French Pastry School in Chicago, and co-authored The Art of French Pastry cookbook. He is the primary subject of the 2010 documentary Kings of Pastry.

Early life and education
Pfeiffer was born and raised in the small village of Marlenheim in the Alsace region in France. He learned to bake in his father's bakery. At 15, Pfeiffer became an apprentice at Jean Clauss Pâtisserie in Strasbourg, France. He studied food technology at Baldung Grien College in France, where he was named Best Apprentice and received a degree in pastry science.

Career

Personal pastry chef, hotels and restaurants
Pfeiffer spent a year as a pastry chef on an oil tanker in the French Navy, and worked in several pastry shops in Alsace, including Chocolaterie Egli and Pâtisserie Naegel. He then served as executive pastry chef for the Sultan of Brunei, who was at the time the richest man in the world; for the Royal Family in Riyadh, Saudi Arabia; and at the Hyatt Regency Hong Kong. He moved to the United States in 1991 and became executive pastry chef at the Sheraton Hotel and then the Fairmont Hotel in Chicago.

In 2010, Pfeiffer received the Bretzel d'Or from the Institute of Arts and Popular Traditions of Alsace, recognizing Alsatians who preserve the arts and traditions of Alsace. He was inducted into the Pastry Hall of Fame by Dessert Professional magazine in 2011. Pfeiffer is a co-owner of Pierre Zimmerman's French bakery La Fournette, which opened in 2012.

French Pastry School

The French Pastry School was founded in Chicago, Illinois, in 1995 by Pfeiffer and fellow master pastry chef Sébastien Canonne. The vocational secondary school was founded to teach traditional French pastry-making. It is the only school in the United States dedicated entirely to teaching pastry. Pfeiffer serves as dean of student affairs and is also a pastry instructor at the school.

Kings of Pastry
The 2010 documentary film Kings of Pastry focuses on Pfeiffer as he pursues the coveted Meilleurs Ouvriers de France, the highest artisanal accolade in France, in a competition held once every three or four years in Lyon, France. The film was directed by Chris Hegedus and D.A. Pennebaker. In the San Francisco Chronicle review, Pfeiffer was singled out as "a wonderful lead character… understated, warm and intelligent."

The Art of French Pastry
Pfeiffer and New York Times food columnist Martha Rose Shulman co-authored the 2013 cookbook The Art of French Pastry, which presents recipes and a detailed look at classic French pastries. It includes anecdotes from Pfeiffer about growing up in a bakery family, and lessons learned in his years as an apprentice.

The book won the 2014 James Beard Foundation Book Award for Best Cookbook in the Baking and Dessert category, and the 2014 International Association of Culinary Professionals Award for Best Cookbook in the Baking category.

Personal life
Pfeiffer lives in Chicago and has one daughter.

Bibliography
 The Art of French Pastry - with Martha Rose Shulman (Alfred A. Knopf, 2013)

Honours and awards
 First Place, National Chocolate Competition, Masters of Chocolate, 1995
 Top Ten Pastry Chefs in America, Dessert Professionals magazine, 1996
 Top Ten Pastry Chefs in America, Dessert Professionals magazine, 1997
 Coupe du Monde de la Pâtisserie, silver medal, 1997
 Winner, National Pastry Championship, Beaver Creek, Colorado, 2000
 Pastry Chef of the Year, World Pastry Forum, 2004
 Jean Banchet Award for Culinary Excellence, Best Celebrity Pastry Chef, 2005
 Bretzel d'Or, Institute of Arts and Popular Traditions of Alsace, 2010
 Pastry Hall of Fame inductee, Dessert Professional magazine, 2011
 Coached the winning team at the 2011 National Pastry Championship
 Chicago Culinary Museum Chefs Hall of Fame inductee, 2012
 International Association of Culinary Professionals Award for Best Cookbook, Baking, for The Art of French Pastry, 2014
 James Beard Foundation Book Award for Baking and Dessert, for The Art of French Pastry, 2014

References

External links
 Biography at French Pastry School 

1961 births
Living people
People from Bas-Rhin
Pastry chefs
French chefs
French food writers
Founders of schools in the United States
People from Chicago
James Beard Foundation Award winners
Educators from Illinois
American women educators
21st-century American women